Maladkal is a village in Karnataka state, comes under Raichur District, Devadurga Taluk and Gabbur hobli. Maladkal lies in northern part of Karnataka(Kalyana Karnataka Division). Maladkal shares its boundary with Gabbur, Ramadurga, Jagatakal, N Ganekal, Maseedpur and Atnur (Manvi taluk). Maladakal is one of the Gram Panchayat in Raichur District.

The village majorly consists of hardworking farmers as most families are agriculture oriented  and others hold their personal businesses. Crops produced in this village are cotton, chilli and rice but, some people also grow vegetables for their livelihood. Maladkal is a self sustained village as most of villages in India, the villagers are mostly interdependent for their livelihood.

After, the completion of Basava Sagara dam (Narayanpura dam) irrigation project the villagers also switched to irrigation farming from dryland farming. Before irrigation farmers used to grow jowar, wheat, millet, sunflower and other dryland crops.

History
As the village lies in part of Raichur Doab has diverse history and culture. The village is considered to be a neolithic site as some of rock arts were found on the hill. This indicates strong cultural influences to pre-modern era.

Demographics
As of 2011 census Maladkal had a population of 2819 among which 1375 were male and 1444 female. 2001 census indicates total population of 2330 among which 1160 were male and 1172 female.

Transport
The village connects to state highway (SH15) from a well maintained road constructed under Gram Sadak Yojana. There are two buses provided by Kalyana Karnataka Road Transport Corporation (previously known as KSRTC) a government run road transport. The two buses connect to Raichur(District) and Devadurga(Tehsil). Nearby Railway station is Raichur railway station which can be reached by bus.

Bus Route
By road Raichur District is about 40km. There are total of four stops on the way (Maladkal-Gabbur-Sulthanpur-Murhanpur-Kalmala-Raichur). Tahsil Devadurga is about 30km.

See also
 Devadurga, India
 Districts of Karnataka
 Gabbur
 List of taluks of Karnataka
 Raichur district
 Shivaraj Patil

References 

Villages in Raichur district
Karnataka